Scouting in South Dakota has a long history, from the 1910s to the present, and serves thousands of youth in programs that suit the environment in which they live.

Early history (1910-1950)
In 1917 the Centerville Council was founded. It folded in 1918.

In 1917 the Mitchell Council was founded. It folded in 1920.

In 1920 the Yankton Council (#555) was founded. It folded in 1924.

In 1930 the Black Hills Area Council (#695) was founded.

In 1920 the Huron Council (#693) was founded. It reformed as the Huron Area Council in 1925, changing its name to the Central South Dakota Council in 1928. In 1942 it changed its name to Pheasant Council (#693).

In 1925 the Southern South Dakota Council (#716) was founded. In 1927 it merged into the Sioux Council.

In 1926 the Hiawatha Council (#733) was founded. In 1927 it merged into the Sioux Council.

In 1925 the Aberdeen Area Council (#703) was founded. In 1928 it changed its name to Northern South Dakota Council, changing the name again in 1931 to the Dasota Council. In 1933, the Dasota Council split, with half of the council going to Central South Dakota and half going to Arrowhead.

In 1934 the Arrowhead Council (#703) was founded. In 1942 the Pheasant Council (#693) was founded. In 1943 Arrowhead merged into Pheasant.

In 1927 the Sioux Council (#733) was founded.

Recent history (1950-1990)
In 1978, the Pheasant Council (#693) merged into the Sioux Council (#733).

Boy Scouts of America in South Dakota today

There are two Boy Scouts of America (BSA) local councils serving South Dakota. All of South Dakota lies within Central Region as part of Area C1A

Black Hills Area Council

The Black Hills Area Council was granted a charter by the National Council, Boy Scouts of America in 1930. It serves (as of when?) over 3,700 youth members in Western South Dakota and Eastern Wyoming.

Organization
The Black Hills Area Council has one district, the Rushmore District.

Camps
In 1976 the Black Hills Area Council established Medicine Mountain Scout Ranch, its year-round camping facility which hosts both unit and family groups.

Mid America Council

The Mid-America Council offers programs in 58 counties in Nebraska, Iowa and South Dakota. The Mid-America Council was formed from a merger of the Covered Wagon Council and the Southwest Iowa Council in 1965. The first recorded Scouting in the area was in 1918 as the Omaha Council. In 2000 the council merged with the Prairie Gold Area Council in Sioux City, Iowa.

Northern Lights Council

The Northern Lights Council serves North Dakota, and counties in South Dakota, northwest Minnesota and northeast Montana.

Sioux Council

Sioux Council serves Scouts in South Dakota, Iowa and Minnesota.

Organization
 Buffalo Ridge District
 Five Rivers District
 Lewis and Clark Trail District
 North Star District
 Pheasant District
 Prairie Hills District

Camps
Sioux Council operates the Lewis & Clark Scout Camp at Tabor, SD; Camp Iyataka at Wilmot, SD; Newton Hills Camp south of Canton, SD; and Camp Shetek at Currie, MN.

Order of the Arrow

Tetonwana Lodge is the local lodge of the Order of the Arrow for Sioux Council. The Tetonwana Lodge was chartered in 1937 and serves Scouts in the states of South Dakota, Minnesota. and Iowa.

On January 1, 1978, Tetonwana Lodge #105 and Iyatonka Lodge #460 merged.  This merger was the result of a merger between Sioux Council and Pheasant Council.

Girl Scouting in South Dakota

Two Girl Scout Councils serve South Dakota.

Girl Scouts - Dakota Horizons

Girl Scouts - Dakota Horizons serves 11,000 girls and has 4,100 adult volunteers in North and South Dakota and in thirteen counties in northwestern Minnesota and Lyon County, Iowa. The council is divided into four geographic areas and has seven offices.  Girl Scouts—Dakota Horizons is headquartered in Sioux Falls, South Dakota.

History
On July 1, 2007 the three Girl Scout councils of South Dakota and the three in North Dakota merged to form the current council. The councils it replaces are:
 Girl Scouts of The Black Hills Council;
 Girl Scouts of Minn-Ia-kota;
 Girl Scouts of Nyoda Council;
 Girl Scouts of Northwest North Dakota;
 Girl Scouts of Sakakawea Council; and
 Girl Scouts-Pine to Prairie Council.

District Offices
 Bismarck, North Dakota - Northwest District
 Fargo, North Dakota - Northeast District
 Rapid City, South Dakota - Southwest District
 Sioux Falls, South Dakota - Southeast District

District Field Offices:
 Minot, North Dakota
 Grand Forks, North Dakota

Camps
 Camp MOE - near Thief River Falls, Minnesota
 Camp Neche - near Bismarck, North Dakota
 Camp Ocankasa - near Mandan, North Dakota
 Camp Owetti - near Minot, ND
 Camp Sakakawea -  near Pick City, North Dakota
 Camp Tonweya is north of Valley City, North Dakota
 Wall Lake Camp is near Sioux Falls, SD
 Camp Nyteepeota - on Lake Kampeska in Watertown, South Dakota
 Camp Arroya is near Mitchell, SD
 Camp Woodlands - near Huron, South Dakota
 Robin's Nest is near Aberdeen, SD
 TDAF (Tom and Danielle Aman Foundation) Lodge is near Aberdeen, SD
 Cedar Canyon Camp is near Rapid City, SD

Former Camps:
 Camp PahaSapa was near Rapid City, South Dakota

Girl Scouts of Greater Iowa

Serves South Dakota girls in Union and part of Clay counties.

See also

 Scouting in North Dakota

External links
 Black Hills Area Council

References

Youth organizations based in South Dakota
South Dakota
Western Region (Boy Scouts of America)
Central Region (Boy Scouts of America)